Edward M. Bumbacco is a Canadian retired ice hockey left wing who was an All-American for Notre Dame.

Career
Bumbacco was a hot commodity as a junior player, being selected by the Toronto Marlboros in the 1969 OHA Priority Selection. He decided to remain with his junior-B club, the Sault Ste. Marie Greyhounds and produced a fantastic season, scoring at a nearly 3-point-per-game pace. Bumbacco led the Greyhounds to a league championship and was named as the playoff MVP. In the 1970 Memorial Cup Sault Ste. Marie received a bye into the quarterfinal round but were defeated by eventual champion Montreal Junior Canadiens four games to one.

After the season Bumbacco began attending Notre Dame University and played four seasons with the varsity hockey team. Bumbacco missed part of his freshman season due to a bout of mononucleosis and then had surgery to repair a separated shoulder in the offseason. Prior to his sophomore season the Fighting Irish joined the WCHA and the team was predictably near the bottom of league standings. Bumbacco did, however, acquit himself well enough to be selected by the Montreal Canadiens in the NHL Draft.

The next year it appeared that Montreal may have made a very shrewd pick when Bumbacco went on a scoring rampage, posting the best offensive season for any Notre Dame player in history. Bumbacco's 90-point season placed him second in the nation and helped Notre Dame finish second in the WCHA. Bumbacco was one of Notre Dame's first two All-Americans (the other being Bill Nyrop) and the Fighting Irish came within a goal of making their first NCAA Tournament appearance. There were high hopes that Notre Dame could contend in Bumbacco's senior season but the winger's point totals were nearly halved and the Irish dropped back to 8th place in the conference.

Bumbacco chose to end his playing career after graduating and he returned to Sault Ste. Marie to work as an executive in the steel industry.

Personal life
Bumbacco's father, Angelo, became the general manager for the Sault Ste. Marie Greyhounds when Eddie was in college. Angelo was instrumental in bringing Wayne Gretzky onto the team and also suggested that the teenage phenom wear the number '99'. Angelo died on October 27, 2020.

Career statistics

Regular season and playoffs

Awards and honors

References

External links

1952 births
Living people
American ice hockey right wingers
Ice hockey people from Ontario
Sportspeople from Sault Ste. Marie, Ontario
Notre Dame Fighting Irish men's ice hockey players
Sault Ste. Marie Greyhounds players
Montreal Canadiens draft picks
AHCA Division I men's ice hockey All-Americans